Nadeem Ahmed (born 28 September 1987) is a Pakistani-born Hong Kong cricketer who appeared in one One Day International against Pakistan in 2004; he bowled 10 overs without taking a wicket and scored 1. He also appeared in two first-class matches in the 2005 ICC Intercontinental Cup taking three wickets.

In December 2017, he finished as the joint-leading wicket-taker in the 2015–17 ICC World Cricket League Championship, with 24 wickets in 11 matches.

In August 2018, he was named in Hong Kong's squad for the 2018 Asia Cup Qualifier tournament. Hong Kong won the qualifier tournament, and he was then named in Hong Kong's squad for the 2018 Asia Cup.

In October 2018, he was charged with five offences under the ICC Anti-Corruption Code. In August 2019, the ICC banned him for life from all forms of cricket, on charges related to match-fixing. The majority of the offences related to matches played by Hong Kong against Canada and Scotland during the 2014 Cricket World Cup Qualifier tournament in New Zealand.

See also
 List of cricketers banned for corruption

References

External links
 

1987 births
Hong Kong cricketers
Hong Kong One Day International cricketers
Hong Kong Twenty20 International cricketers
Living people
Cricketers at the 2010 Asian Games
Pakistani emigrants to Hong Kong
Cricketers from Multan
Cricketers at the 2014 Asian Games
Sportspeople of Pakistani descent
Asian Games competitors for Hong Kong
Sportspeople banned for life